The 129th Regiment Illinois Volunteer Infantry was an American infantry regiment that served in the Union Army during the American Civil War.

Service
The 129th Illinois Infantry was organized at Pontiac, Illinois, and mustered into Federal service on September 8, 1862, for a three-year enlistment.

The regiment was mustered out of service on June 8, 1865.

Total strength and casualties
The regiment suffered 50 enlisted men who were killed in action or who died of their wounds and 2 officers and 128 enlisted men who died of disease, for a total of 180 fatalities.

Commanders
Colonel George P. Smith -resigned on May 8, 1863.
Colonel Henry Case - mustered out with the regiment.

See also
List of Illinois Civil War Units
Illinois in the American Civil War

Notes

References
The Civil War Archive

Units and formations of the Union Army from Illinois
Pontiac, Illinois
Military units and formations established in 1862
Military units and formations disestablished in 1865
1862 establishments in Illinois